Sony Classical is an American record label founded in 1924 as Columbia Masterworks Records, a subsidiary of Columbia Records. In 1980, the Columbia Masterworks label was renamed as CBS Masterworks Records. The CBS Records Group was acquired by Sony in 1988, and in 1990 it was renamed Sony Classical.

Artists
Sony Classical represents artists including: 
Alexis Ffrench
Yo-Yo Ma
Igor Levit
Jonas Kaufmann
Glenn Gould
Wiener Philharmoniker
Joshua Bell
Hans Zimmer
John Williams 
Khatia Buniatishvili
Arthur Rubinstein
Eugene Ormandy
Leonard Bernstein
Teodor Currentzis
Arcadi Volodos
Christian Gerhaher
Vladimir Horowitz
Dirk Maassen
Christoph Koncz
Ivo Pogorelich
Martin Fröst
Leif Ove Andsnes
Lavinia Meijer
Luka Faulisi
Rachel Willis-Sørensen
Mao Fujita
Pablo Ferrández
Miloš
Attacca Quartet

Presidents 
 1997: Peter Gelb (NY)
 2009–2019: Bogdan Roscic
 2019: Per Hauber

See also 
 List of record labels

References

American record labels
Record labels established in 1924
Classical music record labels
Soundtrack record labels
Sony Music